Al-Sawafir al-Shamaliyya was a Palestinian Arab village in the Gaza Subdistrict, located  northeast of Gaza situated along the southern coastal plain of Palestine  above sea level. It had a population of 680 in 1945. Al-Sawafir al-Shamaliyya was depopulated in the 1948 Arab-Israeli War.

History
The village was possibly located at the site of the biblical Shafir, mentioned by Eusibius as a "beautiful town" between Ascalon and Bayt Jibrin. Most modern scholars, however, located Shafir at Khirbat al-Qawm. The Crusader name of the village was Zeophir. They recorded that it was the property of Bishop of Jerusalem in the early 12th century.

Ottoman era
Incorporated into the Ottoman Empire in 1517 with the rest of Palestine,   Al-Sawafir al-Shamaliya appears in the  1596   tax records  as Sawafir al-Halil. It was under the administration of the nahiya of Gaza, part of the Liwa of Gaza. The village contained 112 households, 71 were Muslim and 41 Christians. With a total population of an estimated  616, the villagers paid  a fixed tax-rate of 33,3 % on agricultural products, including  wheat, barley, olive and fruit trees; a total of 19,550 akçe. All of the revenues went to a waqf.

In 1838  the three Sawafir villages  were noted  located in  the Gaza district. The western village  (=Al-Sawafir al-Gharbiyya)  was noted as "in ruins or deserted,” while the two others were noted as being Muslim.

In 1863, French explorer Victor Guérin visited the village, which he estimated  had five hundred inhabitants. He found three barrels of broken ancient columns of gray-white marble  near a well. A koubbeh there was  dedicated to a Sheikh Sidi Abd-Allah.

An Ottoman village list of about 1870 found 55 houses and a population of 171, though the population count included  men only.

In 1882 the PEF's Survey of Western Palestine (SWP) found that al-Sawafir al-Shamaliyya had several small gardens and wells.

British Mandate era
In the 1922 census of Palestine conducted by the British Mandate authorities,  the village had a population of 334 inhabitants, consisting of 333 Muslims and  1 Christian, increasing in  the 1931 census  to an all-Muslim  population of 454  in 77 houses.

In the 1945 statistics the population of  Sawafir esh Shamaliya  was 680 Muslims,    while  the total land area was 5,861 dunams, according to an official land and population survey. Of this, a total of  670 dunams  were used  citrus and bananas, 10  were for plantations and irrigable land, 4,894 for cereals, while 21 dunams were built-up areas.

Many of its houses were built of adobe, although few were made of stone. The residents were Muslim, and the village had its own mosque, but shared a school with the neighboring villages of al-Sawafir al-Gharbiyya and al-Sawafir al-Sharqiyya. The number of students in the school was 280 in the mid-1940s. Agriculture was the mainstay of the economy, and grain, citrus, grapes, and apricots were grown.

1948 War and aftermath
In early May, 1948, the inhabitants of the three Al-Sawafir villages were ordered not to flee, by the  Al-Majdal National Committee.

Al-Sawafir al-Shamaliyya was captured by the Haganah in Operation Barak on May 12. Its residents may have been pushed out by the attack on Bayt Daras on May 10 which was preceded by a mortar attack, but it's more likely that the village was depopulated on the attack of the village itself, according to an Associated Press dispatch which quoted a Haganah source. At the 23 May, 1948, Israeli reports say that at all the three Al-Sawafir villages the inhabitants slept in the fields at night, but returned to work in the villages by day.

At the near end of the 1948 Arab-Israeli War, Egyptian and Sudanese forces planned to recapture al-Sawafir al-Shamaliyya, but were prevented from doing so at an early stage.

Following the war the area was incorporated into the State of Israel, but the land was left undeveloped. According to Palestinian historian, Walid Khalidi, "A few vacant houses and segments of houses, standing amidst wild vegetation, mark the site. One of them has a covered porch supported on two columns. An old village road is also identifiable, and cactuses and fig trees grow on the site."

See also
Depopulated Palestinian locations in Israel

References

Bibliography

External links
Welcome To al-Sawafir al-Shamaliyya
 al-Sawafir al-Shamaliyya,  Zochrot
Survey of Western Palestine, Map 16:   IAA, Wikimedia commons
al-Sawafir al-Shamaliyya from the Khalil Sakakini Cultural Center

District of Gaza
Arab villages depopulated during the 1948 Arab–Israeli War